Talaat Abada (born 1 June 1976) is an Egyptian taekwondo practitioner. He competed in the men's flyweight at the 2000 Summer Olympics.

References

1976 births
Living people
Taekwondo practitioners at the 2000 Summer Olympics
Egyptian male taekwondo practitioners
Olympic taekwondo practitioners of Egypt
20th-century Egyptian people
21st-century Egyptian people